Mark Lionel Furner (born 11 April 1958) is an Australian politician. He was a Labor member of Australian Senate from 2008 to 2014, representing the state of Queensland. Since the 2015 Queensland state election, he has represented Ferny Grove in the Queensland Legislative Assembly.

Early life and education
Initially working as a tradesman in the transport industry, he graduated from the Queensland University of Technology with an associate diploma of business with a major in industrial relations.

Between 1989 and 2008 he worked as a union official for the Transport Workers' Union, the Queensland Police Union, and the National Union of Workers. Furner held a range of positions within the Labor Party between 1996 and 2008.

Career
He was elected to the Senate at the 2007 federal election as the third candidate of the Labor Party Senate ticket in Queensland. He was defeated at the 2013 federal election and his term ended on 30 June 2014.

He won the seat of Ferny Grove representing Labor at the 2015 Queensland state election. On 10 February 2017, Furner was appointed to the posts of Minister for Local Government and Minister for Aboriginal and Torres Strait Islander Partnerships in a Cabinet reshuffle announced by Premier Annastacia Palaszczuk.

In December 2017, Furner was sworn in as Queensland's Minister for Agricultural Industry Development and Fisheries. He retained this portfolio following the swearing in of the Third Palaszczuk Ministry in November 2020.

Personal life
Furner is married to Lorraine and they have three children; Troy, Stacey and Sally.

See also
Rudd Government
Gillard Government
Second Palaszczuk Ministry
Third Palaszczuk Ministry

References

External links
 Personal website

1958 births
Living people
Australian Labor Party members of the Parliament of Australia
Members of the Australian Senate
Members of the Australian Senate for Queensland
Members of the Queensland Legislative Assembly
Australian Labor Party members of the Parliament of Queensland
21st-century Australian politicians
Labor Right politicians